Neptunium(III) fluoride or neptunium trifluoride is a salt of neptunium and fluorine with the formula NpF3.

Synthesis
Neptunium(III) fluoride can be prepared by reacting neptunium dioxide with a gas mixture of hydrogen and hydrogen fluoride at 500 °C:

References

Neptunium compounds
Fluorides
Actinide halides